Lendrick Muir School was a Scottish residential school for children of above average intelligence, aged 11–19 (originally 7–18) or latterly children with dyslexia, located in Perth and Kinross on an unclassified road from Rumbling Bridge to Crook of Devon.

Etymology
The places in Scotland with the name Lendrick are derived from Brittonic llanerch (or *lanerc), meaning "a vale, a space of level ground" or "clearing, pasture''.

Pupils
Children from all over the country, and a few from other parts of the United Kingdom, attended, and all were funded by their local authorities. School refusal was a common reason for pupils being placed here, and many had psychological and behavioural problems due to familial abuse or neglect.

The school claimed not to accept pupils who were "sexually promiscuous, psychotic, habitually delinquent or seriously behaviourally disturbed".

Children were expected to be able to follow an academic syllabus, leading to examinations such as Ordinary Grades, Highers or Certificate of Sixth Year Studies, set by the Scottish Examination Board.

Location and environs
The school was located off Naemoor Road, an unclassified road, connecting the A823 at Rumbling Bridge with the A977 at Crook of Devon. It was about 800 metres east of Rumbling Bridge and one kilometre west of Crook of Devon, situated at latitude 56.18629 longitude -3.57635. Male pupils lived within the main school building, while female pupils were housed separately in a large detached property, 'Craigard', a few kilometres away.

Nearby villages, in addition to the two mentioned include Drum, Yetts o' Muckart and Pool of Muckhart.  The school was about 500 metres south-west of the River Devon and, because the river changes direction at Crook of Devon, it was also located about 500 metres north of the River Devon. The school was about 3 kilometres south-east of the Ochil Hills.

The school was situated in 200 acres of rough estate except for the potato field leased to a local farmer. The Sports field covered 25 acres and was often grazed by the same farmer's sheep.

Sports
The School provided facilities for hockey, football, cricket, and tennis. Other leisure time facilities included hill-climbing and canoeing, and various indoor pastimes.

The school had a house system for the purposes of sports competitions. To begin with there were two houses: Devons and Muirs. Later there was an Ochil House but that was discontinued after a time.

Naemoor House
The school was housed in Naemoor House, formally Naemoor School, a neo-classical mansion designed by Adam Frame of Alloa which was listed in 1977, and this was a continuation of Riverview Private School in Alloa, run by husband and wife team John and Janet Grieve. Shortly before it became Lendrick Muir School, William Younger, the brewer, from Alloa injected finance into it.

Change in direction
In 1988, the School changed its policy on admissions and its client groups, focussing on children with dyslexia. It retained this focus until its closure in 1998.

Closure
It closed in 1998, following a "damning verdict on the [...] accommodation, management and curriculum". According to the Sunday Mail, among other things, "[The School] which receives more than £250,000 a year in fees has been branded unsafe, dirty and lacking in resources. [...] The inspectors' report revealed a long list of problems. They found dirty and unsafe rooms, bad teaching and a lack of books and computers, and said the dinners were poor."

The head of the school, John McLaughlin, ( who joined the school in its last year) accepted these criticisms and said: "[To stay open] we would have to have put in place a whole range of things. There would be no more communal showering, individual rooms where possible, pleasant views from windows, proper systems of care, quality learning for staff, appropriate ratios."

Current use
The building has been owned and run by the Scripture Union since its closure as a school in 1998,  and the SU now offers residential activity breaks for young people.

See also
 Education in Scotland
 Juvenile delinquency
 Special education in Scotland
 Supervision requirements -  Definition of 'Supervision Requirements'.

External links
 - Lendrick Muir website
 - Children's Hearings Website
 - Scottish Children's Reporter Administration
 - Archive of Lendrick Muir School

Notes

Defunct special schools in Scotland
Defunct boarding schools in Scotland
Defunct schools in Perth and Kinross
Special schools in Scotland